Rignai or Rinai is a wrap-around worn by Tripuri women.

Rignai or Rinai is the traditional dress of Tripuri women,the native inhabitants of Tripura. It is similar to the traditional dresses of other indigenous communities in the north-eastern Indian states of Assam, Manipur, Meghalaya, Mizoram. It is worn by wrapping it around the waist. Sometimes it is worn with "risa" which is a piece of cloth wrapped around the bust. It is worn by the every Tripuri women in Tripura. A similar kind of rignai is worn by Manipuris.

The most significant rignai is called the "Chamathwi bar" and comprises white cloth bordered by maroon or other colors. The "Chamathwi bar" is worn during important occasions like wedding ceremonies and festivals like Goria Puja and Hangrai.

In Bangladesh, "Rignai Risha" is known as "Rinai Risha" to Bangladeshi Tripuri Community. The design of Rignai or Rinai has its pattern according to each clan. each clan has its own pattern.

See also
 Tripuri people
 Tripuri Dances
 Tripuri dress
 Tripuri culture

References

Tripuri dress